Virlia is a village in Ukraine. It is located in Zviahel Raion, Zhytomyr Oblast. The territorial administrative code (KOATUUI) is 1820680801. Its population was 742 in 2001. Its postal index is 12730. Its district telephone code is 4144

Village council
The village council is located at 12734, Ukraine, Zhytomyr Oblast, Zviahel Raion, village Virlia

External links
 Virlya on website High Rada of Ukraine 

Villages in Zviahel Raion